Luana Bühler (born 28 April 1996) is a Swiss footballer who plays as a defender and has appeared for the Switzerland national team.

Career
Bühler has been capped for the Switzerland national team, appearing for the team during the 2019 FIFA Women's World Cup qualifying cycle.

International goals

References

External links
 
 
 

1996 births
Living people
Swiss expatriate sportspeople in Germany
Swiss expatriate women's footballers
Expatriate women's footballers in Germany
Swiss women's footballers
Switzerland women's international footballers
Women's association football defenders
TSG 1899 Hoffenheim (women) players
Frauen-Bundesliga players
FC Zürich Frauen players
Swiss Women's Super League players
UEFA Women's Euro 2022 players